The Battle of Salvatierra was a naval battle that occurred in Salvatierra, Guanajuato, Mexico, a town located on the banks of the Lerma River. It took place on Good Friday, April 16, 1813.

References

Naval battles involving Mexico
Naval battles involving Spain
Conflicts in 1813
Battles of the Mexican War of Independence
April 1813 events